Barbus rhinophorus is a species of ray-finned fish in the genus Barbus.

Footnotes 
 

Endemic fauna of Angola
R
Fish described in 1910